Huang Yong (November 18, 1974 – December 26, 2003) was a Chinese serial killer accused of murdering 17 teenage boys (although he is suspected of 25 murders) between September 2001 and November 2003. He was executed in December 2003.

Early life 
Huang was a migrant worker located in southern China. After serving a tour of duty in the Chinese Army, Huang became a migrant worker, doing agricultural jobs throughout southern China.

Murders and modus operandi 
In September 2001, Huang started to lure young boys from video halls, Internet cafes and video arcades to his house by offering to recommend them for well-paying jobs or to fund their schooling or sightseeing tours. In his house, Huang drugged the youths and strangled them with a rope, often reviving them multiple times to torture them before ultimately killing them.

Huang told investigators that he chose to victimize boys because killing women and girls would make him see himself as less of a "hero," and he did not kill elderly men because they were too discerning.

Final victim, capture, and execution 
In November 2003, a 16-year-old boy named Zhang Liang went to the police. Investigators at first were not convinced of Liang's story but the boy claimed that Huang had invited him to his apartment by offering him a job. Once he got there, Zhang said that Huang strangled him to unconsciousness three times. Afterwards, when the young boy awoke, Huang said to him, "I killed at least 25 people. You're number 26", but Liang talked Huang out of killing him, after which Huang gave Liang enough money to get home. Instead, Liang reported his torture and attempted murder to the police.

While initially skeptical of Liang's claims, the police believed Liang's story and arrested Huang, who was convicted of 17 murders and sentenced to death on December 9, 2003. He was executed by a bullet to the head on December 26, 2003. After his execution, authorities found two more bodies in Huang's home.

Huang described the motive for his crimes by saying, "I've always wanted to be an assassin since I was a kid, but I never had the chance."

See also
List of serial killers by country
List of serial killers by number of victims
Javed Iqbal (serial killer)
Dennis Nilsen

References

1974 births
2001 murders in China
2002 murders in China
2003 deaths
2003 murders in China
21st-century Chinese criminals
21st-century executions by China
Child abuse incidents and cases
Chinese male criminals
Chinese people convicted of murder
Executed Chinese serial killers
Executed people from Henan
Executed People's Republic of China people
Incidents of violence against boys
Male serial killers
People convicted of murder by the People's Republic of China
People from Zhumadian
Violence against men in Asia